Hugh O'Shaughnessy (21 January 1935 – 1 March 2022) was an English journalist and writer.

Biography
O'Shaughnessy was born in Reading, Berkshire of Irish parents. His father, Charles, was a porter at the Home Office, and his mother, Mary (nee Donovan), was an administrative assistant. He was educated at the Catholic St Benedict’s school in Ealing and Worcester College, Oxford where he received a BA in Modern Languages. For over 40 years he wrote for major newspapers including The Economist, The Observer, The Independent, The Irish Times, the Financial Times and most frequently The Guardian; and he made many reports for BBC News.
O'Shaughnessy published a number of books and articles focusing on Latin American politics, making many trips to Central and South America to study social and political issues. He was a friend of Chilean president Salvador Allende. He was also the author of commentaries on the politics of Catholicism. He was founder of the Latin America Bureau.

O'Shaughnessy won several awards, including two British Press Awards, the 1986 Maria Moors Cabot prize for journalistic contributions to inter-American understanding and the Wilberforce Medallion from the city of Hull. He was recognised by the Columbia University Graduate School of Journalism in the United States.

He lived in London. He married Georgina Alliston (1937–2011, daughter of architects Jane Drew and James Alliston) in 1961, and they had four children: Frances, Thomas, Matthew and Luke. O'Shaughnessy died on 1 March 2022, at the age of 87.

Publications 
 Engagement to Europe, Open Library, Liberal Publications Dept (1965) OL20273667M
 What Future for the Amerindians of South America?, Minority Rights Group report (1973) 
 Oil in Latin America, Financial Times (1976) 
 Nicaragua: dictatorship and revolution, Latin America Bureau (1979) (with Jan Karmali and Andrew Pollak)
 Relations with Central American and Caribbean countries, Enstone, Oxon: Ditchley Foundation (1981)
 Towards a Democratic Central America, Fabian Society (1984) 
 Grenada: revolution, invasion and aftermath, Sphere Books (1984)  also Hamish Hamilton (1984) 
 Grenada: An Eyewitness Account of the US Invasion and the Caribbean History that Provoked It, Dodd Mead (1985) 
 Latin Americans, BBC Books (1988) 
 Around the Spanish Main: Travels in the Caribbean and the Guianas, Ebury Press (1991) 
 East Timor: Getting Away with Murder?, London, British Coalition for East Timor (1994) 
 Brazilian Energy: Privatisation and the Market, London, Financial Times Energy Publishing (c1997)
 Mexican Energy: A Market in Transition, London, Financial Times Energy Publishing (c1998)
 Pinochet: The Politics of Torture, Latin America Bureau (1999)  also NYU Press (2000) 
 Chemical warfare in Colombia: The Costs of Coca Fumigation Latin America Bureau (2005)  (with Sue Branford)
 Taking on the Rich: The Art of Political Murder, New Statesman (2008) (with F. Goldman)
 The Priest of Paraguay: Fernando Lugo and the Making of a Nation, Zed Books (2009)    (with Edgar Venerando Ruiz Díaz)

References

External links 
 The Independent, 5 October 2014 Hugh O'Shaughnessy on Jean-Claude Duvalier, former President of Haiti
 
 Hugh O'Shaughnessy interviewed (30 August 2009) by George Galloway on The Priest of Paraguay
 The Guardian 5 February 2000 Case for the prosecution. Review by Nicholas Lezard on Pinochet: The Politics of Torture. "Nicholas Lezard is minded to make Hugh O'Shaughnessy's book on the damning evidence against Augusto Pinochet required reading"
 Exposé Reveals Little Review by Hugh O'Shaughnessy of The Torture Report: What the Documents Say About America's Post-9/11 Torture Program by Larry Siems 
Obituary, The Guardian, 14 March 2022. Retrieved 15 March 2022.
 

1935 births
2022 deaths
Alumni of Worcester College, Oxford
English journalists
English writers
Maria Moors Cabot Prize winners
English people of Irish descent